Clinton Lee Scott (September 28, 1887-September 28, 1985) was an American Universalist minister and outspoken pacifist.  

From 1914 to 1946, he served Universalist churches in Northfield, Vermont; Buffalo, New York; Philadelphia, Pennsylvania; Los Angeles, California; Atlanta, Georgia; Peoria, Illinois; Dayton, Ohio; El Dorado, Ohio and Gloucester, Massachusetts. He was a State Convention Superintendent in Massachusetts and Connecticut, returning to parish work in 1956, serving in Tarpon Springs, Florida, until retiring at age 84.

His 1946 book, Parish Parables is still available as an ebook.  His theology evolved from liberal Christian, to Christian humanist, to global humanist. As the first prominent Universalist to embrace humanism, he signed the Humanist Manifesto I in 1933 and Humanist Manifesto II in 1973.

References

External links 
 Dictionary of Unitarian & Universalist Biography - Clinton Lee Scott
 Universalism, A Philosophy For Living. Radio Address over WMEX by Dr. Clinton Lee Scott, September 30, 1946

1887 births
1985 deaths
American Unitarian Universalists
Clergy of the Universalist Church of America
19th-century Christian universalists
20th-century Christian universalists